Carlos Alcaraz defeated Pablo Carreño Busta in the final, 6–3, 6–2 to win the singles tennis title at the 2022 Barcelona Open. Alcaraz saved two match points in his semifinal match against Alex de Minaur. With the win, Alcaraz entered the top 10 in rankings for the first time in his career, becoming the youngest man to do so since Rafael Nadal in 2005.

Nadal was the defending champion, but withdrew before the tournament to recover from a rib injury.

This tournament marked the final professional appearance of former world No. 5 Tommy Robredo, who made his ATP Tour debut at the same tournament in 1999.

Seeds
All seeds receive a bye into the second round.

Draw

Finals

Top half

Section 1

Section 2

Bottom half

Section 3

Section 4

Other entry information

Wildcards

Withdrawals

Qualifying

Seeds

Qualifiers

Lucky losers

Draw

First qualifier

Second qualifier

Third qualifier

Fourth qualifier

Fifth qualifier

Sixth qualifier

References

External links
 Main draw
 Qualifying draw

Singles
Barcelona Open Banc Sabadell - Singles